Roger Adam was a French aircraft designer and manufacturer who produced light aircraft in kit from 1948 to 1955. He established the firm Etablissements Aeronautiques R. Adam.

Aircraft Designs Produced
Adam RA-14 Loisirs
 Adam RA-15 Major
Adam RA-17

Year of birth missing
Year of death missing
20th-century French people
French aerospace engineers